Bixby Public Schools is a public school district in Bixby, Oklahoma, a suburb south of Tulsa, Oklahoma. As of 2022, the K-12 district serves over 7,000 students and is made up of 9 schools:
 Central Elementary: Pre-K through 3rd Grade
 Central Intermediate: 4th Grade-6th Grade
 North Elementary: Pre-K through 3rd Grade
 North Intermediate: 4th Grade through 6th Grade
 East Elementary & Intermediate: Pre-K through Grade 6
 West Elementary & Intermediate: Pre-K through Grade 6
 Bixby Middle School:  Grades 7 and 8
 9th Grade Center
 Bixby High School:  Grades 10 through 12
As of 2017, the district's total High School enrollment (grades 9-12) is the 21st largest in the state of Oklahoma.

The district includes almost all of Bixby, all of Leonard, and portions of Broken Arrow, Jenks, and Tulsa.

References

External links
 

School districts in Oklahoma
Education in Tulsa County, Oklahoma